"On My Knees" is a 1978 single by Charlie Rich with Janie Fricke.  "On My Knees" was written by Charlie Rich and was his ninth and final number one country hit.  The single was also Janie Fricke's first of eight songs to hit number one on the country chart.  "On My Knees" stayed at number one for a single week and spent a total of ten weeks on the country chart. The song was originally recorded by Rich as a solo record (Phillips 3052, 1960) and peaked at positions below 100 in the US trades Cashbox and Music Vendor.

Chart performance

References
 

1978 singles
Charlie Rich songs
Janie Fricke songs
Male–female vocal duets
Epic Records singles
Songs written by Charlie Rich
1978 songs
Song recordings produced by Billy Sherrill